Edouard Bamporiki (born October 24, 1983) is a Rwandan politician and artist. He currently holds a seat in the Rwandan cabinet as States Minister in charge of culture in the Ministry of Youth and Culture

Bamporiki has been a filmmaker and actor. He is also a published author and poet.

Early life and education 
Bamporiki was born in Nyamasheke Distric, Western Province of Rwanda. He attended school in the area. 

In 2003, when Bamporiki was 20, he joined an episodic theatre that aired on the national radio. This gave him a countrywide exposure as a talented actor.

He holds a bachelor's degree in Law from the Université Libre de Kigali (ULK).

Political career 
In 2013, Bamporiki was elected Member of the Rwandan Parliament, Lower Chamber.

In 2019, he was appointed States Minister in the Ministry of Youth and Culture by President Paul Kagame. In May 2022, he was placed under house arrest amid a corruption investigation.

Prior to the cabinet appointment, he was Chairman of Rwanda's National Itorero Commission.

Film career 
Bamporiki is a filmmaker. Long Coat is one his most famous films - through a story of a survivor of the 1994 Genocide against the Tutsi and one of a perpetrator's son, the film focuses on leaving one's past behind. Bamporiki wrote, starred in, directed and produced the 63 minute drama which premiered in 2008. It earned him local and international attention by winning him top prize at the African Film Festival in New York.

Bamporiki had made his début in Munyurangabo, a film by Lee Isaac Chung from which he was nominated Best Actor at Cannes. He produced and acted in Rwanda: Take Two in 2010 and a year later, he starred in Kinyarwanda, a historical drama, alongside Cassandra Freeman. His latest on-screen appearance was in 2015 when he starred in a romance drama Umutoma.

In 2017, Bamporiki published a book with a title My Son, It Is A Long Story: Reflections of Genocide Perpetrators. The book launch was attended by Rwandan First Lady Jeannette Kagame.

References 

Living people
1983 births
Rwandan directors
Government ministers of Rwanda
21st-century Rwandan politicians